The  (and the earlier 151 and 161 series variants) was a Japanese limited express electric multiple unit (EMU) type operated by Japanese National Railways (JNR).

Variants
 151 series
 161 series
 181 series

The 151 series trains were introduced in 1958 on Kodama limited services on the Tokaido Main Line. 161 series trains were introduced in 1959 on Toki limited services on the Joetsu Line. Some 151 and 161 series cars were subsequently modified to become 181 series alongside newly built 181 series cars.

Preserved examples
 KuHa 181 1: Preserved outside the Kawasaki Heavy Industries factory in Kobe, and restored in November 2016 to its original style and numbering as "KuHa 26001"
 KuHa 181 45: Preserved at the Railway Museum in Saitama Prefecture

References

Further reading

 
 

Train-related introductions in 1958
Electric multiple units of Japan
Kawasaki multiple units
Kinki Sharyo multiple units
Toshiba multiple units
1500 V DC multiple units of Japan